Admiral Sunil Lanba, PVSM, AVSM, PJG, ADC (born 17 July 1957) is a retired Indian naval officer who served as the 23rd Chief of the Naval Staff of the Indian Navy. He assumed the office on 31 May 2016 after Admiral Robin K. Dhowan and demitted office three years later on 31 May 2019. During this time, he also served as Chairman of the Chiefs of Staff Committee and Honorary Aide-de-Camp to the President of India.

Early life and education 
Lanba was born on 17 July 1957 and hails from Palwal district, Haryana. He attended Mayo College, Ajmer; National Defence Academy, Pune; Defence Services Staff College, Wellington; College of Defence Management, Secunderabad and Royal College of Defence Studies, London, and is a post-graduate in Defence and Management studies.

Military career 

Lanba was commissioned into the Indian Navy as an officer on 1 January 1978 into the Executive Branch of Indian Navy. He is a Navigation and Direction specialist who has served as the navigation and operations officer onboard various ships in both the Eastern and Western Fleets. Promoted substantive captain on 1 January 2000, he also served as executive officer of aircraft carrier  and the Fleet Operations Officer of the Western Fleet.

He has also held numerous training positions like training officer at the National Defence Academy; Directing Staff at the College of Defence Management; Commandant of the National Defence College and Flag Officer Sea Training organisation at the Local Workup Team (West), Western Naval Command.

Lanba on being elevated to flag rank, was the flag officer commanding Maharashtra and Gujarat Naval Area.(FOMAG) and Chief of Staff, Southern Naval Command. On being promoted to vice admiral, he was the Chief of Staff, Eastern Naval Command; Flag Officer Commanding-in-Chief of the Southern and Western Naval Commands; Fleet Oper and the Vice Chief of Naval Staff from 2 June 2014 to 30 March 2015.

On 5 May 2016, the Union Government announced that Lanba will take charge as the Chief of the Naval Staff on 31 May 2016, replacing Admiral Robin K. Dhowan who retired the same day.

He took over as the Chairman of the chiefs of staff committee (CoSC) from outgoing IAF chief Marshal Arup Raha on 29 December 2016.

Bi-lateral visits as CNS

Awards and decorations

{| style="margin:1em auto; text-align:center;"
|
|
|
|
|-
|
|
|
|
|-
|
|
|
|
|}

He was awarded the from Meritorious Service Medal Singapore on September 8, 2022. He was awarded for his outstanding contributions in enhancing the strong and long-standing bilateral defence relationship between the Indian Navy and the Republic of Singapore Navy. Admiral Lanba became the first Indian to receive this award.

Personal life 
He is married to Reena Lanba who is a qualified teacher and a home-maker. They have two daughters, named Moneesha and Sukriti, and a son named Adhiraj.

References

External links 

Indian Navy admirals
Commandants of National Defence College, India
Flag Officers Sea Training
Living people
Recipients of the Param Vishisht Seva Medal
Recipients of the Ati Vishisht Seva Medal
Mayo College alumni
Chiefs of the Naval Staff (India)
Vice Chiefs of Naval Staff (India)
1957 births
National Defence Academy (India) alumni
College of Defence Management alumni
Defence Services Staff College alumni